Betty Nippi-Albright is a Canadian politician, who was elected to the Legislative Assembly of Saskatchewan in the 2020 Saskatchewan general election. She represents the electoral district of Saskatoon Centre as a member of the Saskatchewan New Democratic Party.

Hailing from the Kinistin First Nation, Nippi-Albright is of Saulteaux and Cree ancestry and is a residential school survivor. She is one of two Indigenous MLAs currently serving from the NDP, alongside Doyle Vermette.

Nippi-Albright raised concerns about first nations communities during the COVID-19 pandemic in Saskatchewan.

References 

Living people
21st-century Canadian women politicians
Saskatchewan New Democratic Party MLAs
Women MLAs in Saskatchewan
Politicians from Saskatoon
Ojibwe people
Saulteaux
Cree people
21st-century First Nations people
Year of birth missing (living people)
First Nations women in politics